Hustle Town is the second solo studio album by American hip hop recording artist South Park Mexican. It was released on March 3, 1998 via Dope House Records. The album contains the hit single "Mary-Go-Round", which was an underground hit and it broke him out of Texas.

Track listing

Personnel
Carlos Coy – main artist
Wilson Flores – featured artist (tracks: 1, 5, 6)
Alfonso Cook – featured artist (tracks: 2, 6)
Lawrence Gurule – featured artist (tracks: 8-13)
Shetoro Henderson – engineering & mastering
Arthur Coy Jr. – executive producer
Jimmy Stephens – artwork
Pen & Pixel – design

References

External links

1998 albums
South Park Mexican albums